His Bones are Coral is a 1955 thriller novel by the British writer Victor Canning. It was published in the United States with the alternative title of Twist of the Knife. The title is a reference to William Shakespeare's Full fathom five from The Tempest.

Synopsis
Howard Smith, a pilot flying between Cairo and Port Sudan with a cargo of illicit drugs crash-lands in the desert near a port on the Red Sea. Escaping from the wreckage and needing to find a way out of his problems, he accept an offer from a marine biologist to take part in a coral-finding expedition in shark-infested waters.

Film adaptation
It was adapted into the 1969 American film Shark! directed by Samuel Fuller and starring Burt Reynolds, Arthur Kennedy and Silvia Pinal.

References

Bibliography
 Goble, Alan. The Complete Index to Literary Sources in Film. Walter de Gruyter, 1999.
 Reilly, John M. Twentieth Century Crime & Mystery Writers. Springer, 2015.

1955 British novels
British thriller novels
British crime novels
British novels adapted into films
Novels by Victor Canning
Novels set in Egypt
Novels set in Sudan
Hodder & Stoughton books